Lagos State House, is the official residence of the governor of Lagos State. Lagos State has two governor's residences, one at Marina in Lagos Island and another at Ikeja on the Mainland. Both residences are used for official and residential purposes.

While all previous governors in Lagos State has lived in the Lagos State House at Marina, the past governor of Lagos State, Akinwunmi Ambode is the first governor to live in the Lagos State House in Ikeja. The governor moved into the Ikeja residence on resumption of office as the governor of Lagos State on 29 May 2015, the governor cited punctuality as one of the reason for his movement to the Ikeja Governor's House.

The governor's lodge at Ikeja was commissioned in 2007 by Asiwaju Bola Tinubu, although the building was started in 1988 by Late Admiral Mike Akhigbe.

See also 
 Presidential Lodge

References

External links 

Official residences in Lagos